Joseph Kish (June 14, 1899 – March 14, 1969) was an American set decorator. He won an Academy Award and was nominated for four more in the category Best Art Direction. He worked on 130 films between 1942 and 1966.

Selected filmography
Kish won an Academy Award for Best Art Direction and was nominated for four more:
Won
 Ship of Fools (1965)
Nominated
 Address Unknown (1944)
 Joan of Arc (1948)
 Journey to the Center of the Earth (1959)
 The Slender Thread (1965)

References

External links

1899 births
1969 deaths
American art directors
American set decorators
Best Art Direction Academy Award winners